This is a list of people who have served as Custos Rotulorum of Leicestershire.

 John Beaumont bef. 1544–1558
 Francis Cave 1558 – aft. 1564
 Henry Hastings, 3rd Earl of Huntingdon bef. 1573–1595
 George Hastings, 4th Earl of Huntingdon 1596–1604
 Sir Henry Beaumont bef. 1605–1607
 Henry Hastings, 5th Earl of Huntingdon bef. 1608–1643
 Ferdinando Hastings, 6th Earl of Huntingdon 1643–1646
 Interregnum
 Henry Hastings, 1st Baron Loughborough 1660–1667
 Basil Feilding, 2nd Earl of Denbigh 1667–1675
 Theophilus Hastings, 7th Earl of Huntingdon 1675–1680
 William Feilding, 3rd Earl of Denbigh 1680–1681
 Theophilus Hastings, 7th Earl of Huntingdon 1681–1689
 Thomas Grey, 2nd Earl of Stamford 1689–1702
 John Manners, 9th Earl of Rutland 1702–1703
For later custodes rotulorum, see Lord Lieutenant of Leicestershire.

References
Institute of Historical Research – Custodes Rotulorum 1544–1646
Institute of Historical Research – Custodes Rotulorum 1660–1828

Leicestershire
Custos